The 2023 Extremaduran regional election will be held on Sunday, 28 May 2023, to elect the 11th Assembly of the autonomous community of Extremadura. All 65 seats in the Assembly will be up for election. The election will be held simultaneously with regional elections in eleven other autonomous communities and local elections all throughout Spain.

Overview

Electoral system
The Assembly of Extremadura is the devolved, unicameral legislature of the autonomous community of Extremadura, having legislative power in regional matters as defined by the Spanish Constitution and the Extremaduran Statute of Autonomy, as well as the ability to vote confidence in or withdraw it from a regional president.

Voting for the Assembly is on the basis of universal suffrage, which comprises all nationals over 18 years of age, registered in Extremadura and in full enjoyment of their political rights. Additionally, Extremadurans abroad are required to apply for voting before being permitted to vote, a system known as "begged" or expat vote. The 65 members of the Assembly of Extremadura are elected using the D'Hondt method and a closed list proportional representation, with an electoral threshold of five percent of valid votes—which includes blank ballots—being applied in each constituency. Alternatively, parties failing to reach the threshold in one of the constituencies are also entitled to enter the seat distribution as long as they run candidates in both districts and reach five percent regionally. Seats are allocated to constituencies, corresponding to the provinces of Badajoz and Cáceres, with each being allocated an initial minimum of 20 seats and the remaining 25 being distributed in proportion to their populations.

Election date
The term of the Assembly of Extremadura expires four years after the date of its previous election, unless it is dissolved earlier. The election decree shall be issued no later than the twenty-fifth day prior to the date of expiry of parliament and published on the following day in the Official Journal of Extremadura (DOE), with election day taking place on the fifty-fourth day from publication. The previous election was held on 26 May 2019, which means that the legislature's term will expire on 26 May 2023. The election decree must be published in the DOE no later than 2 May 2023, with the election taking place on the fifty-fourth day from publication, setting the latest possible election date for the Assembly on Sunday, 25 June 2023.

The president has the prerogative to dissolve the Assembly of Extremadura and call a snap election, provided that no motion of no confidence is in process and that dissolution does not occur before one year has elapsed since the previous one. In the event of an investiture process failing to elect a regional president within a two-month period from the first ballot, the Assembly shall be automatically dissolved and a fresh election called.

Parliamentary composition
The table below shows the composition of the parliamentary groups in the Parliament at the present time.

Parties and candidates
The electoral law allows for parties and federations registered in the interior ministry, coalitions and groupings of electors to present lists of candidates. Parties and federations intending to form a coalition ahead of an election are required to inform the relevant Electoral Commission within ten days of the election call, whereas groupings of electors need to secure the signature of at least two percent of the electorate in the constituencies for which they seek election, disallowing electors from signing for more than one list of candidates.

Below is a list of the main parties and electoral alliances which will likely contest the election:

Opinion polls
The tables below list opinion polling results in reverse chronological order, showing the most recent first and using the dates when the survey fieldwork was done, as opposed to the date of publication. Where the fieldwork dates are unknown, the date of publication is given instead. The highest percentage figure in each polling survey is displayed with its background shaded in the leading party's colour. If a tie ensues, this is applied to the figures with the highest percentages. The "Lead" column on the right shows the percentage-point difference between the parties with the highest percentages in a poll.

Graphical summary

Voting intention estimates
The table below lists weighted voting intention estimates. Refusals are generally excluded from the party vote percentages, while question wording and the treatment of "don't know" responses and those not intending to vote may vary between polling organisations. When available, seat projections determined by the polling organisations are displayed below (or in place of) the percentages in a smaller font; 33 seats are required for an absolute majority in the Assembly of Extremadura.

Results

Overall

Notes

References
Opinion poll sources

Other

Extremadura
2020s
2023 regional elections in Spain